Poplar Grove Airport  is a small general aviation airport located in Poplar Grove, Illinois, United States. The airport was founded in 1972 as Belvidere Airport and renamed in 1994. It is located 3 miles south of Poplar Grove, and 3 miles north of Belvidere. The airport is privately owned and open to the public.

It is the home of the Poplar Grove Vintage Wings and Wheels Museum and BelAir Estates, a residential fly-in neighborhood.

The airport was named 2015 Illinois Private Airport of the Year by the Illinois Department of Transportation's Division of Aeronautics.

The airport has three runways. Runway 12/30 is the airport's only paved runway and is 3773 x 50 ft (1150 x 15 m). Runways 9/27, which is 2709 x 200 ft (826. x 61 m), and 17/35, which is 2467 x 150 ft (752 x 46 m), are both made of turf.

For the 12-month period ending May 31, 2020, the airport averages 181 aircraft operations per day, or just over 66,000 per year. All traffic is classified as general aviation.

An aviation repair shop called Poplar Grove Airmotive is based on the airport. The shop services airframe, engine, and accessory needs and sells parts. 12 acres of land on the airport have been donated to the Poplar Grove Aviation and Education Association for the purposes of preserving 20th century aviation and educating the community, including offering scholarships for new pilots to begin flight training.

References

External links
 Airport website
 Poplar Grove Vintage Wings and Wheels Museum
 BelAir Estates

Airports in Illinois
Transportation buildings and structures in Boone County, Illinois